The 65th Texas Legislature met from January 11, 1977, to May 30, 1977, in regular session, and again in two special called sessions (see below). All members present during this session were elected in the 1976 general elections.

Sessions
Regular session: January 11, 1977 – May 30, 1977
1st called session: July 11, 1977 – July 21, 1977
2nd called session: July 10, 1978 – August 8, 1978

Party summary

Senate

House

Officers

Senate
 Lieutenant Governor: William P. Hobby Jr., Democrat
 President Pro Tempore (regular session): Betty Andujar, Republican
 President Pro Tempore (called session): Peyton McKnight, Democrat

House
 Speaker of the House: Bill Wayne Clayton, Democrat

Members

Senate

Dist. 1
 A. M. Aikin Jr. (D), Paris

Dist. 2
 Peyton McKnight (D), Tyler

Dist. 3
 Don Adams (D), Jasper

Dist. 4
 Carl A. Parker (D), Port Arthur

Dist. 5
 William T. "Bill" Moore (D), Bryan

Dist. 6
 Lindon Williams (D), Houston

Dist. 7
 Gene Jones (D), Houston

Dist. 8
 O.H. "Ike" Harris (R), Dallas

Dist. 9
 Ron Clower (D), Garland

Dist. 10
 Bill Meier (D), Euless

Dist. 11
 Chet Brooks (D), Houston

Dist. 12
 Betty Andujar (R), Fort Worth

Dist. 13
 Walter Mengden (R), Waco

Dist. 14
 Lloyd Doggett (D), Austin

Dist. 15
 Jack Ogg (D), Houston

Dist. 16
 Bill Braecklein (D), Dallas

Dist. 17
 A. R. "Babe" Schwartz (D), Galveston

Dist. 18
 W. N. "Bill" Patman (D), Ganado

Dist. 19
 Glenn Kothmann (D), San Antonio

Dist. 20
 Carlos F. Truan (D), Corpus Christi

Dist. 21
 John Traeger (D), Seguin

Dist. 22
 Tom Creighton (D), Mineral Wells

Dist. 23
 Oscar Mauzy (D), Dallas

Dist. 24
 Grant Jones (D), Abilene

Dist. 25
 W. E. "Pete" Snelson (D), Midland

Dist. 26
 Frank Lombardino (D), San Antonio

Dist. 27
 Raul Longoria (D), Edinburg

Dist. 28
 Kent Hance (D), Lubbock

Dist. 29
 Tati Santiesteban (D), El Paso

Dist. 30
 Ray Farabee (D), Wichita Falls

Dist. 31
 Max Sherman (D), Amarillo

House

External links

65th Texas Legislature
1977 in Texas
1977 U.S. legislative sessions
1978 in Texas
1978 U.S. legislative sessions